The Scotland national cricket team toured Bangladesh for a tour match and two ODI matches in December 2006. They lost all three matches.

Dates

Squads

* Dewald Nel was picked for the team but withdrew before the tour started.

ODI matches

Tour match

ODI series

1st ODI

2nd ODI

References

2006 in Bangladeshi cricket
2006 in Scottish cricket
Bangladeshi cricket seasons from 2000–01
International cricket competitions in 2006–07
2006-07